The Third Day is a psychological thriller folk horror drama television serial created by Felix Barrett and Dennis Kelly for HBO and Sky Atlantic. The series premiered in the United States on 14 September 2020, on HBO, and in the United Kingdom on 15 September 2020, on Sky Atlantic.

Premise
The series chronicles the individual journeys of a man and woman who arrive on a mysterious island at different times.

The production is split into three interconnected parts. The first, "Summer", directed by Marc Munden, follows Sam (played by Jude Law), a man drawn to a mysterious island off the English coast where he encounters a group of islanders set on preserving their traditions at any cost.

The second part of the production, "Autumn", was broadcast in the format of a twelve-hour live event on the island. Described by the producers of the show as a "major immersive theatre event", the live segment of the show aired in one continuous take and is intended to allow followers of The Third Day to "inhabit the story as it happens". It features Jude Law and other members of the series cast. Part 2 also features singer Florence Welch.

The third part of the series, "Winter", directed by Philippa Lowthorpe, follows Helen (played by Naomie Harris), a strong-willed outsider who comes to the island seeking answers but whose arrival precipitates a fractious battle to decide its fate.

Cast

Main
Jude Law as Sam
Katherine Waterston as Jess
John Dagleish as Larry
Mark Lewis Jones as Jason
Jessie Ross as Epona
Richard Bremmer as "The Father"
Paddy Considine as Mr. Martin
Emily Watson as Mrs. Martin
Freya Allan as Kail
Börje Lundberg as Professor Mimir
Florence Welch as Veronica
Paul Kaye as "The Cowboy"
Naomie Harris as Helen
Nico Parker as Ellie
Charlotte Gairdner-Mihell as Talulah

Recurring
Stanley Auckland as "Nathan"
Will Rogers as Danny
Amer Chadha-Patel as the preacher
Lauren Byrne as Mya
Tom Lawrence as Tomo
Anna Calder-Marshall as Margaret
George Potts as Alan
Hilton McRae as Janny

Episodes

Production
The series was commissioned in June 2019, with the announcement that Jude Law was cast in the lead role. Marc Munden was hired to direct the first three episodes, with Dennis Kelly writing. In July, Katherine Waterston, Paddy Considine and Emily Watson were added to the cast. Naomie Harris and John Dagleish were added in August, with Philippa Lowthorpe hired to direct the final three episodes of the series. Kit de Waal and Dean O'Loughlin also joined Kelly to co-write two episodes.

The series is set on Osea Island and its causeway. Filming began on the series in July 2019 in the United Kingdom in Essex and Kent. Production visited many locations in Kent for filming, including Fog Signal Station at Dungeness, Allens Farm, Harty Ferry Road near Harty Ferry Inn in Swale, Walpole Bay Tidal Pool, St Clere Estate, Bedgebury National Pinetum Forest, Hever Castle, Grain Coastal Park on the Isle of Grain, Chislehurst Caves and Shellness Beach on the Isle of Sheppey.

Release
The series was initially set to premiere in the United States on HBO on 11 May 2020, and on Sky Atlantic on 12 May 2020. In April 2020, HBO and Sky pulled the series from the schedule due to post-production on the series being affected by the COVID-19 pandemic. It was subsequently rescheduled for a 14 September premiere in the U.S., and 15 September in the UK.

The first episodes of both the "Summer" and "Winter" parts premiered as part of the Primetime section of the 2020 Toronto International Film Festival on 11 September 2020.

The "Autumn" live event was broadcast live in the UK on Sky Arts and streamed for free via the Sky UK and HBO Facebook pages, on 3 October 2020.

Reception

Critical response
For the miniseries, review aggregator Rotten Tomatoes reported an approval rating of 76% based on 41 reviews, with an average rating of 7.03/10. The website's critics consensus reads, "With a sufficiently arresting atmosphere and captivating performances from stars Jude Law and Naomie Harris, The Third Day is an intriguing—if overly familiar—addition to the folk-horror genre." Metacritic gave the miniseries a weighted average score of 68 out of 100 based on 15 reviews, indicating "generally favorable reviews".

U.S. ratings

Footnotes

References

External links

2020 British television series debuts
2020 British television series endings
2020s British television miniseries
2020s British drama television series
2020s British mystery television series
English-language television shows
HBO original programming
Sky Atlantic original programming
Television shows filmed in the United Kingdom
Television shows set in Essex
Television series by Scott Free Productions